The Ford Lectures, technically the James Ford Lectures in British History, are an annual series of public lectures held at the University of Oxford on the subject of English or British history. They are usually devoted to a particular historical theme and usually span six lectures over Hilary term. They are often subsequently published as a book.

History of the lectureship
The lectures are named in honour of their benefactor, James Ford (1779–1851). Ford was educated at King's School, Canterbury, and matriculated at Trinity College, Oxford, in 1797.  After graduating in 1801, he went on to his Master of Arts and Bachelor of Divinity degrees.  He was a Fellow of Trinity College from 1807 to 1830.  His antiquarian collections have been dispersed, but survive in the holdings of the Bodleian Library, the Library of Trinity College, the British Library, and the Cambridge University Library.

In his will, Ford left a number of bequests, some of which were held in trust for the support of his surviving siblings. After they had all died, Oxford University received his bequest of £2,000 to fund a professorship of English history, which was to be established when the principal had grown to support payment of £100 per year. When this goal was reached in 1894, the sum was not enough to support a professor at the current stipend. After considerable discussion within the University, the funds were assigned to fund an annual lectureship in English history by a lecturer who was to be chosen annually by a board of electors. The first Ford's Lecturer in English History was S. R. Gardiner, elected for the academic year beginning in 1896. In 1994, the University of Oxford formally changed the official title of the series from "Ford's Lectures in English History" to "Ford's Lectures in British History".

As the lectures may be given in either the Michaelmas or Hilary terms (or partly in both), confusion can arise on publication because either calendar year may be stated. The following list gives the academic year.

Lecturers
The following have been Ford Lecturers.

To 1899
 1896–97 S. R. Gardiner, Cromwell's Place in History
 1897–98 Frederic William Maitland, Township and borough 
 1898–99 Adolphus William Ward, Great Britain and Hanover: some aspects of the personal union
 1899-1900 James Hamilton Wylie, The Council of Constance to the death of John Hus

1900–1924
 1900–01 Charles Firth, Cromwell's army: a history of the English soldier during the Civil Wars, the Commonwealth and the Protectorate 
 1901–02 Charles Plummer, The life and times of Alfred the Great 
 1902–03 Julian Corbett, England in the Mediterranean
 1903–04 Leslie Stephen, English literature and society in the 18th century 
 1904–05 Andrew Lang
 1905–06 Arthur L. Smith, The Church and State in the Middle Ages
 1906–07 Francis Haverfield, The Roman Occupation of Britain
 1907–08 Alfred Comyn Lyall
 1908–09 Arthur Johnson, The Disappearance of the Small Landowner
 1909–10 George Edmundson, Anglo-Dutch rivalry during the first half of the 17th century
 1910–11 John William Fortescue, British Statesmen of the Great War, 1793–1814 
 1911–12 Reginald L. Poole, The Exchequer in the Twelfth Century
 1912–13 T. F. Tout, The place of the reign of Edward II in English history 
 1913–14 Peter Hume Brown, The legislative union of England and Scotland
 1914–15 Andrew George Little, Studies in English Franciscan History
 1915–16 No Election
 1916–17 A. G. Little, Studies in English Franciscan History
 1917–18 No Election
 1918–19 No Election
 1919–20 John E. Lloyd
 1920–21 Arthur Frederic Basil Williams
 1921–22 Sir Richard Lodge, Great Britain and Prussia in the 18th century 
 1922–23 J. Armitage Robinson, The times of Saint Dunstan
 1923–24 C. L. Kingsford, Prejudice and promise in 15th century England

1925–1949
 1924–25 Henry William Carless Davis, The age of Grey and Peel
 1925–26 
 1926–27 F. M. Powicke, Stephen Langton
 1927–28 Albert Frederick Pollard
 1928–29 F. M. Stenton, The First Century of English Feudalism, 1066–1166
 1929–30 Alfred Francis Pribram, England and the International Policy of the European Great Powers, 1871–1914
 1930–31 Keith Feiling
 1931–32 Keith Grahame Feiling, The tories in opposition and in power, 1714–1806
 1932–33 A. Hamilton Thompson, The English clergy and their organisation in the later Middle Ages 
 1933–34 Lewis Namier, King, Cabinet, and Parliament in the Early Years of George III
 1934–35 Herbert Edward Salter, Medieval Oxford
 1935–36 Richard Henry Tawney
 1936–37 George James Turner
 1937–38 Harold William Vazeille Temperley
 1938–39 Eileen Power, The Wool Trade in English Medieval History
 1939–40 James A. Williamson, The Ocean in English History
 1940–41 Robin Ernest William Flower
 1941–42 V. H. Galbraith, Studies in the public records
 1942–43 Wilhelm Levison, England and the Continent in the Eighth Century
 1943–44 Admiral Sir Herbert Richmond, Statesmen and Sea Power
 1944–45 Austin Lane Poole, Obligations of Society in the XII and XIII Centuries
 1945–46 David Mathew, The Social Structure in Caroline England
 1946–47 T. F. T. Plucknett, Legislation of Edward I
 1947–48 Sir Charles Webster 
 1948–49 David Knowles, The episcopal colleagues of Archbishop Thomas Becket
 1949–50 Ian Richmond

1950–1974
 1950–51 G. N. Clark, King James I and Dutch "Imperialism" in Asia
 1951–52 Richard Pares, King George III and the politicians
 1952–53 K. B. McFarlane, The Nobility of Later Medieval England
 1953–54 Thomas Southcliffe Ashton
 1954–55 C. R. Cheney, From Becket to Langton: English church government 1170–1213
 1955–56 A. J. P. Taylor, The Trouble Makers: Dissent over Foreign Policy, 1792–1939
 1956–57 Philip Grierson
 1957–58 Norman Sykes
 1958–59 Norman Sykes, From Sheldon to Secker: aspects of English church history, 1660–1768
 1959–60 G. Kitson Clark, The making of Victorian England
 1960–61 Sir Goronwy Edwards, The second century of the English Parliament
 1961–62 Christopher Hill, Intellectual Origins of the English Revolution
 1962–63 D. C. Douglas, William the Conqueror: the Norman impact upon England
 1963–64 Norman Gash, Reaction and reconstruction in English politics, 1832–1852
 1964–65 Eleanora Carus-Wilson, The rise of the English woollen industry
 1965–66 J. H. Plumb The growth of political stability in England: 1675–1725
 1966–67 Beryl Smalley, Intellectuals and Politics in the twelfth century
 1967–68 Robert Blake, The Conservative Party from Peel to Churchill 
 1968–69 Charles Wilson, Queen Elizabeth and the Revolt of the Netherlands
 1969–70 J. M. Wallace-Hadrill, Early Germanic kingship in England and on the continent
 1970–71 Michael Howard, The continental commitment: the dilemma of British defence policy in the era of the two world wars
 1971–72 G. R. Elton, Policy and Police: the enforcement of the Reformation in the age of Thomas Cromwell
 1972–73 Rodney Hilton, The English peasantry in the later Middle Ages
 1973–74 John Gallagher, The Decline, Revival and Fall of the British Empire

1975–1999
 1974–75 Joan Thirsk, Economic Policy, Economic Projects and Political Economy, 1540–1700
 1975–76 J. P. Kenyon, Revolution principles: the politics of party, 1689–1720
 1976–77 G. W. S. Barrow, The Anglo-Norman era in Scottish history
 1977–78 F. S. L. Lyons, Culture and Anarchy in Ireland, 1890–1939
 1978–79 Patrick Collinson, The religion of Protestants: the church in English society, 1559–1625  
 1979–80 Donald A. Bullough, Alcuin: Achievement and Reputation
 1980–81 Owen Chadwick, Britain and the Vatican during the Second World War
 1981–82 J. J. Scarisbrick, Religious Attitudes in Reformation England
 1982–83 J. O. Prestwich, The Place of War in English History 1066–1214
 1983–84 Ian R. Christie, Stress and stability in late 18th-century Britain: Reflections on the British avoidance of revolution 
 1984–85 John Habakkuk, Marriage, debt, and the estates system: English landownership 1650–1950
 1985–86 S. F. C. Milsom, Law and Society in the 12th and 13th centuries
 1986–87 Keith Robbins, Nineteenth-century Britain: England, Scotland and Wales: the making of a nation 
 1987–88 Conrad Russell, The Causes of the English Civil War
 1988–89 Barbara Harvey, Living and dying in England 1140–1540, the monastic experience
 1989–90 Paul Langford, Public Life and Propertied Englishmen, 1689–1798
 1990–91 Lord Briggs, Culture and Communication in Victorian England
 1991–92 David Underdown, A Freeborn People: politics and the nation in seventeenth-century England
 1992–93 P. H. Sawyer, Wealth in Anglo-Saxon England
 1993–94 F. M. L. Thompson, Gentrification and the Enterprise Culture: Britain 1780–1980 
 1994–95 Paul Slack, From Reformation to improvement: public welfare in early modern England 
 1995–96 James Campbell, Origins of the English state
 1996–97 Jose Harris, A land of lost content? Visions of civic virtue from Ruskin to Rawls
 1997–98 R. R. Davies, The first English empire: power and identities in the British Isles, 1093–1343
 1998–99 T. C. Smout, Use and delight: environmental history in Northern England since 1600
 1999–2000 Keith Thomas, The ends of life: roads to fulfilment in early modern England

From 2000
 2000–01 Christopher Dyer, An Age of Transition? Economy and Society in England in the Later Middle Ages
 2001–02 Peter Clarke Britain's image in the world in the twentieth century 
 2002–03 Quentin Skinner, Freedom, Representation, and Revolution, 1603–51
 2003–04 John Maddicott, The Origins of the English Parliament
 2004–05 Marianne Elliott, Religion and Ireland
 2005–06 John Morrill, Living with Revolution
 2006–07 Robert Bartlett, The Learned Culture of Angevin England
 2007–08 Ross McKibbin, Parties People and the State: Politics in England c.1914–1951
 2008–09 John Brewer, The Politics of Feeling in the Age of Revolutions, 1760–1830
 2009–10 David Bates, The Normans and Empire

 2010–11 Peter Lake, Bad Queen Bess? Libelous Politics and Secret Histories in an Age of Confessional Conflict
 2011–12 Roy Foster, Making a Revolution in Ireland, c.1890–1916
 2012–13 John Blair, Building the Anglo-Saxon Landscape
 2013–14 Susan Pedersen, Internationalism and Empire: British Dilemmas, 1919–1939
 2014–15 Steven Gunn, The English people at war in the age of Henry VIII
 2015–16 Christine Carpenter, The Problem of the Fourteenth Century: Politics, State and Society in England 1307–1399
 2016–17 Stefan Collini, History in English Criticism, 1919–1961
 2017–18 Alexandra Walsham, The Reformation of the Generations: Age, Ancestry, and Memory in England, 1500–1700
 2018–19 Mark Bailey: After the Black Death: Society, economy and the law in fourteenth-century England
 2019–20: Margot Finn, Family and Empire: Kinship and British Colonialism in the East India Company Era, c. 1750–1850.

 2020–21: Jane Ohlmeyer, Ireland, Empire, and the Early Modern World
 2021–22: Robin Fleming, Dogsbodies and Dogs' Bodies: A Social and Cultural History of Roman Britain’s Dogs and People
 2022–23: Colin Kidd, Peculiarities of the English Enlightenment: Ancients, Moderns and Pagan Pasts (forthcoming)

References

External links
Current Regulations for the Lectureship: Oxford University Statutes on Ford's Lectures

1896 establishments in England
Recurring events established in 1896
Lecture series at the University of Oxford
Lists of historians
Ford Lectures
Historiography of the United Kingdom
Historiography of England
Annual events in the United Kingdom